The PAC P-750 XSTOL, (formerly known as the PAC 750XL) is a utility aircraft of conventional all-metal low-wing monoplane design, with fixed tricycle undercarriage. Combining the engine and wings of the PAC Cresco with a new large fuselage and modified tail, all versions to date have been powered by a 750 hp (560 kW) Pratt & Whitney Canada PT6 turboprop.  It is designed and manufactured in Hamilton, New Zealand by  Pacific Aerospace Limited.

Development

The design made its maiden flight in 2001. As with the Cresco, horizontal tail surfaces presented difficulties, and these were redesigned before the type entered production. The PAC 750 received full US FAA certification in 2004.

In 2008 the manufacturer stated production was increasing from 12 to 24 per year. In 2008 there was some New Zealand media criticism of government assistance for the manufacturer following cancellation of a large order. By February 2016, 100 aircraft had been produced, over 120 by Jan 2019.

In 2012 Pacific Aerospace achieved certification for the P-750 XSTOL against ICAO Annex 6 for Single Engine IFR Commercial Passenger Transport Operations.

Pacific Aerospace has allowed licence production in China. A civil cargo PAC750XL UAV with minimal changes to enable remote piloting has been flown in China. This UAV is not endorsed by the New Zealand manufacturer and is a separate entity.

In February 2016, the Papua New Guinea Defence Force signed an agreement to purchase four aircraft. The first was delivered in 2018 to the PNGDF's Air Operations Element.

In March 2018, Pacific Aerospace launched an updated variant, the Super-Pac XL, with a 900 hp (670 kW) PT6A-140A up from 750 hp and a four-blade 108in (270 cm) Hartzell propeller.
It competes with the Supervan 900 re-engined Cessna 208 Caravan with a 900 hp Honeywell TPE331 and 110in four-blade Hartzell propeller.
A modified P-750 is ground tested, and will begin flights for a second quarter of 2018 certification and later deliveries.

To increase payload, a weight-reduction programme for 2020 replaces flight-control surfaces in aluminium by composite, installs lighter seating, and strips out cabin components.
The passenger and utility aircraft markets account for 70% of its sales.

F-25 

Financed by UK start-up Arcus Fire, the F-25 is an aerial firefighting variant, scheduled to secure its supplemental type certificate in 2021.
The $2.2 million aircraft competes against other types like the Polish PZL Dromader, targeting a 100 units market within five years.
The conversion includes a new hydraulics pack, fire gate and a 300 kg (600 lb) increase in payload.

Design

The type was targeted initially to the narrow market of skydiving. In the parachuting role, the high-lift wings from the Cresco and relatively high power-to-weight ratio enable the PAC 750 to take a load of parachutists to 12,000 feet (3,700 m) and return to land in 10 minutes.

A wider market was subsequently sought, and examples have been sold for use in utility roles, including freight, agricultural applications, passenger operations, aerial photography and surveying. Twelve aircraft have now been extensively modified for geo-survey work, being fitted with a magnetic anomaly detector sting tail.  Proposed ski and float conversions have yet to fly. The P-750 XSTOL is used in South Africa by NatureLink on United Nations Humanitarian Air Services / World Food Programme contracts. While the manufacturer claims lower single-engine running costs than many other utility types, for example, the twin-engined DHC-6 Twin Otter, the type has less usable volume (large cargo panniers providing a partial solution).  Due to the unique wing design the P-750 is capable of carrying a higher payload than the larger Cessna 208 Caravan.

The aircraft is currently marketed as the P-750 XSTOL.
Pacific Aerospace offers the P-750 XSTOL in many configurations - passenger, freight/cargo, skydive, agricultural, aerial survey and surveillance.  The aircraft is marketed as excelling on rough, unpaved airstrips and is available with a wide tyre modification for this purpose. A modified version is being developed for counter-insurgency and light attack.

For passenger and cargo operations, the cabin can be outfitted with up to nine passenger seats or with cargo holds.  There is also an optional 1,000 lb capacity cargo pod available which attaches to the belly of the aircraft.  The aircraft can be configured as all-passenger, all-cargo or a combination of both.  All variants have double cargo doors at the rear of the cabin.

North Korean appearance incident
A P-750 XSTOL in the markings of the North Korean state airline was photographed during the Wonsan Air Festival on September 24–25, 2016.  The aircraft had been sold to China in September 2015 and then illegally exported to North Korea.  Pacific Aerospace expressed surprise, however New Zealand Customs discovered that even after the company was aware the aircraft was in North Korea some of the company staff had planned to sell replacement parts for the aircraft to a Chinese company. In October 2017 Pacific Aerospace pleaded guilty to three charges of planning to export aircraft parts indirectly to North Korea, and another charge relating to incorrect completion of export documentation.

Specifications

See also

References

External links

 
 
 

750XL
2000s New Zealand civil utility aircraft
Single-engined tractor aircraft
Low-wing aircraft
Single-engined turboprop aircraft
Aircraft first flown in 2001
STOL aircraft